John Humphreys may refer to:

 John Humphreys (economist) (born 1978), Australian economist and Liberal Democratic Party first President
 John Lisseter Humphreys (1881–1929), British colonial administrator and Governor of North Borneo
 John Humphreys (cricketer), Australian cricketer
 John Humphreys (fencer) (1932–2017), Australian Olympic fencer

See also
 John Humphrys (born 1943), Welsh broadcaster, journalist and author
John Humphries (disambiguation)
John Humphrey (disambiguation)
 Jonathan Humphreys (born 1969), Welsh rugby player